Enø is a small Danish island off the west coast of Zealand between Karrebæk Fjord and Karrebæksminde Bugt. Now part of Næstved Municipality, it is connected to Karrebæksminde, Zealand, by a road bridge. There are about 1,000 summerhouses and a holiday centre at Enø By on the northern part of the island. EnøOverdrev in the southern part is a nature reserve and bird sanctuary.

See also
List of islands of Denmark

References

Islands of Denmark
Geography of Næstved Municipality

nl:Enø